Benedikt Konstantinovich Livshits (24 December 1886 (Old Style)/6 January 1887 (New Style) – 21 September 1938) was a poet and writer of the Silver Age of Russian Poetry, a French–Russian poetry translator.

Life and career

Livshits was born to an assimilated Jewish family in Odessa. He studied law at Novorossia University and then moved to Kiev University, where he graduated in 1912. He was conscripted to the Russian army and served in the 88th Infantry Regiment. In 1914, he was conscripted again and served in the infantry during World War I, being awarded the Cross of St. George.

In 1908, "The Exhibition of Modern Art" was staged in Kublin. This exhibition, which included the works of Georges Braque, Henri Matisse, and other European postimpressionist painters, made a profound impression on the young Livshits. His first poetry was published in the Anthology of Modern Poetry (Kiev) a year later. In 1910 he worked for Sergei Makovsky's symbolist art magazine Apollon.

Together with Wladimir Burliuk, David Burliuk, Vladimir Mayakovsky, and Vasily Kamensky he was a member and co-founder of the major Russian Futurist group Hylaea (Russian Gilea). It is said to have been established after Livshits and the Burliuk brothers vacationed at the estate of Count Mordvinov in Chernianka. David Burliuk, Kamensky, and Livshits would form the nucleus of Cubo-Futurism, which became the most influential subdivision of Futurism.

In 1933 he published a book of memoirs, The One and a Half-Eyed Archer, which is considered one of the best histories of Russian Futurism. This work also detailed the cultural discomfort of a fully assimilated Jewish artist in Russia. In 1934, he published a large book of translations from French poetry, From Romantics to Surrealism. An analysis of his translation works noted his tendency to uphold the structure of the material being translated as a whole and to maintain close proximity to the original.

In 1937, Livshits also became a victim of Joseph Stalin's Great Purge. He was arrested and summarily executed on 21 September 1938 as an "enemy of the people". His dossier was falsified to state that he died of heart failure on 15 May 1939.

Literary works 
 The Flute of Marsias (1911, printing was destroyed by government censorship).
 Sun of wolves (Volch'e solntse), 1914
 The One and a Half-eyed Archer (Polutoraglazyj strelets), 1933 - memoirs about the Futurist movement.

Notes

External links 

 Terra-Futura.com
 Benedikt Livshic, poète hyléen at monderusse.revues.org (French)
 Publications list
 Art/Auctions: Impressionist & Modern Art Part Two, May 9, 2002, at Sotheby's at www.thecityreview.com
 Biography and works 

1886 births
1938 deaths
Writers from Odesa
People from Odessky Uyezd
Odesa Jews
Soviet poets
Russian male poets
Soviet male writers
20th-century Russian male writers
20th-century Russian poets
Jewish poets
Russian avant-garde
French–Russian translators
20th-century translators
Russian military personnel of World War I
NKVD
Great Purge victims from Ukraine
Jews executed by the Soviet Union
Soviet rehabilitations